Easton College is a college of further and higher education in Norfolk. It is located on a  campus in the village of Easton. The college has specialist facilities for training in agriculture, horticulture, arboriculture, countryside, animal studies, and equine, alongside provision in construction, engineering, foundation learning, sport and public services. The college is part of City College Norwich, following the de-merger of Easton & Otley College in January 2020. The Otley campus became part of Suffolk New College.

The college
Easton College offers full-time courses in the following curriculum areas:

 Agricultural Engineering
 Agriculture
 Animal Management
 Arboriculture
 Construction
 Countryside Management
 Equine Studies
 Fisheries
 Floristry
 Foundation Learning
 Gamekeeping
 Horticulture
 Motor Vehicle Engineering
 Sport
 Uniformed Public Services

Tennis centre
Easton College Tennis Centre is a large development consisting of 8 indoor tennis courts. 

Built with partnership funding from the Learning and Skills Council, The Lawn Tennis Association, the Norfolk Lawn Tennis Association and the college, the project was completed in two phases. In autumn 2008 the first stage of the building project was completed when the four court air hall became operational. Once these courts were up and running the tennis programme started to develop. In early 2009, building work started on phase two of the project. This second stage was this permanent structure, including four more acrylic indoor courts, changing rooms, toilets, refreshments, offices, seminar rooms, and a viewing gallery.

References

External links
 

Agricultural universities and colleges in the United Kingdom
Further education colleges in Norfolk
Education in Norfolk
Further education colleges in Suffolk
Education in Suffolk